An idyll (from Greek , eidullion, "short poem"; occasionally spelt idyl in American English) is a short poem, descriptive of rustic life, written in the style of Theocritus' short pastoral poems, the Idylls (Εἰδύλλια).

Unlike Homer, Theocritus did not engage in heroes and warfare. His idylls are limited to a small intimate world, and describe scenes from everyday life. Later imitators include the Roman poets Virgil and Catullus, Italian poets Torquato Tasso, Sannazaro and Leopardi, the English poet Alfred, Lord Tennyson (Idylls of the King), and Nietzsche's Idylls from Messina. Goethe called his poem Hermann and Dorothea—which Schiller considered the very climax in Goethe's production—an idyll.

Terminology
The term is used in music to refer generally to a work evocative of pastoral or rural life such as Edward MacDowell's Forest Idylls, and more specifically to a kind of French courtly entertainment (divertissement) of the baroque era where a pastoral poem was set to music, accompanied by ballet and singing. Examples of the latter are Lully's Idylle sur la Paix set to a text by Racine and Desmarets' Idylle sur la naissance du duc de Bourgogne set to a text by Antoinette Deshoulières.

In the visual arts, an idyll is a painting depicting the same sort of subject matter to be found in idyllic poetry, often with rural or peasant life as its central theme. One of the earliest examples is the early 15th century Très Riches Heures du Duc de Berry. The genre was particularly popular in English paintings of the Victorian era.

See also
 Arcadia (utopia)
 Et in Arcadia ego
 Pastoral
 John Greenleaf Whittier, Snow-Bound: A Winter Idyl
 William Wordsworth, The Solitary Reaper

References

External links
 

Genres of poetry
Ancient Greek poetry
Music genres
Visual arts genres